Norman Clegg, often nicknamed Cleggy, is a fictional character from the world's longest-running sitcom, Last of the Summer Wine.

Fictional character biography

Early life
Norman Clegg was the only child of a builder and decorator, David Clegg, and his rather volatile wife Violet (Peter Sallis and Maggie Ollerenshaw). David, a war veteran, was very quiet and rarely interacted with his family, much to the concern of Norman, who thought his father didn't like him. (Vi felt the same way.) His mother was overprotective of her son, and panicked when he was walked home by a girl a year older than him.

Later years
Norman married Edith in the 1940s; she died in 1971. Especially in earlier episodes, Norman reminisced about his wife and her traits: how she hated his camping phase; and her sharp tongue. After her death and being made redundant from his job as a lino salesman, he hung around with his school-friends Compo Simmonite and Cyril Blamire. They divided their time between the local library, pubs, eating at Sid's Café and devising adventurous exploits to stave off boredom. Clegg was a cynic, and more critical of the schemes than the others, preferring to take a back seat and casually watch, for example, an antic involving three meat pies; Compo, Cyril and Sid; an alloy spoon and a very angry Ivy.

Norman enjoys watching Compo and the third man, usually Foggy, arguing or trading insults such as "great long dollop" (Sid), "Elsie" (Foggy) and "Rex Hammond" (Cyril). He often goes along with the ideas just to please the others. Clegg aims for a relaxing, peaceful retirement following his redundancy, but is continually involved in the schemes of Foggy and the others. Happy just reading alone in his cosy home, he also finds enjoyment in some of the simpler things in life, such as Sid's skirting board and the price of beer. He is also so anxious and shy that he wears several layers of clothing: vest/long johns, shirt, jumper/sweater, waistcoat/suit vest, jacket/sport coat, and finally a plastic mac, which he just carries when it's not windy or raining. He is also the only one of the trio with a driving licence and so finds himself pressured into driving on the very rare occasions that they are walking about locally and manage to find a vehicle but no driver. This invariably results in a panic attack for Clegg, who fumbles about uncontrollably with the gears and pedals, limiting his speed to about 3 mph (5 km per hour) (which is just to his liking). In the series 1 episode "The New Mobile Trio", he decides that the trio should buy a car, but shortly after they bought one he accidentally crashed it into a passing tractor. Because Clegg was at first optimistic on the idea of driving, it is likely that incidents such as this triggered his fear of driving. He mentions in series 21 that he no longer holds a driving licence and is proud as a result. He sometimes could also be quite superstitious as in one episode he believed that he, Compo and Foggy had aroused the anger of an old Yorkshire god named Earnshaw. In the episode where Compo is buried, he believed that Compo heard him shouting "Goodbye Compo" when in fact it was a random passer-by who overheard him.

Clegg was the sounding-board for Compo's glee and the third man's authority, and was often instrumental in pointing out the pitfalls concealed within the schemes of the third man. Clegg is also well known for his philosophical asides, which have received praise for interjecting intellectual material into the series. In early episodes, Clegg was much more opinionated and courageous. Sometimes he was shown to be the leader of the trio in the earlier episodes (such as taking them on a camping trip in the hills one stormy night). Within a few years, he became more quiet and laid-back (although he was still seen to relish the odd practical joke or escapade), and the group came to be led by Foggy and the "third men" who succeeded him. During the earlier episodes, he was also less awkward and more talkative when interacting with women, which is shown when he once made an offhand remark about Nora Batty's father (which she overheard). When Cyril commented on how brave it was to do so, he claimed to have had "years of marital combat experience". He eventually became more nervous when interacting with the local ladies. Despite his neurosis and frequent scepticism, Clegg was the one who had the most average lifestyle and, particularly in earlier episodes, is portrayed as the most friendly out of the trio.

From series 9 onwards, Howard often involved Clegg in his risky schemes to have an affair with Marina without Pearl finding out. As a result, Clegg is often shown to be afraid of Pearl (though when not involved in any of Howard's schemes they are both shown to be friendly with each other) so, as a result, he is reluctant to help. It is revealed, in the episode "A Sidecar Named Desire", that he'd previously got trapped in a lift with Marina and she cuddled him for warmth, which left him frightened of her. Because Howard frequently sends Clegg in his place to deliver messages to Marina, this leads the latter into believing that Clegg is interested in her and, throughout the series, she is shown to have a soft spot for him, often addressing him on meeting as "Norman Clegg that was". However, one notable exception where Clegg grows to enjoy Marina's company is when she ended up having lunch with him and Truly on his birthday, much to the jealousy and anger of Howard. He is also terrified of going near Auntie Wainwright's shop because she always manages to sell him something that he does not want.

Throughout most of the series he was generally closer to Compo than the "third men" and the two of them often got enjoyment out of the mishaps of Cyril and, later, Foggy. Clegg was the most devastated by Compo's death and felt guilty about not giving him a proper send-off. Subsequently, he became closer to Truly.

With the introduction of Alvin Smedley to the main trio (making them a quartet), Clegg's roles were gradually reduced from series 25 onwards, due to Peter Sallis's health (though there are occasional episodes where he does play a major role). After Keith Clifford departed the show after series 27, the quartet became a trio again; however, Clegg's role (along with Truly's) continued to decrease and most episodes focused on Alvin and Entwistle's schemes. In the two final series, he became a secondary character, as Sallis and Frank Thornton were now over 80, leading to complications over insurance on location filming, so his role was filled by Entwistle (Burt Kwouk). Prior to this, Entwistle had filled Clegg's role on a number of occasions.

Despite being a widower, Clegg only refers to his wife now and then, although he mentions that she was strongly against his camping phase and that she has a brother, whom Clegg toasts for "keeping well away". An early exchange with Nora Batty hinted that Edith was of a similar vein to Nora and Ivy, but this was never elaborated on. Throughout the series, Edith is only referred to by name once.

He was the only character to appear in every single episode of the programme.

References

Last of the Summer Wine
Television characters introduced in 1973